David M. Morgan became Chancellor of Deakin University on 1 January 2006, following the retirement of his predecessor Dr Richard Searby, QC. He retired from the position in December 2016 and was replaced by John Stanhope.

Appointed to Deakin University's Council on 1 January 1999 and served as Deputy Chancellor from 2000 until 2003.

Chair of Deakin University's Finance and Business Affairs Committee.

Chair of the Board of DeakinPrime.

Chairman of the Geelong Economic Development Board and the G21-Geelong Regional Alliance Ltd.

Member of the Board of the Australian Trade Commission.

Member of the Board of the Victorian Centre for Advanced Materials Manufacturing.

Chairman of the National Motor Vehicle Theft Reduction Council.

Former President of Ford Motor Company of Australia and the Federal Chamber of Automotive Industries.

He also holds several senior positions on industry and business councils.

He was educated at North Sydney Boys High School where he was a Prefect in 1954.

References

Academic staff of Deakin University
Living people
Year of birth missing (living people)
People educated at North Sydney Boys High School